Coalmont is a city in Grundy County, Tennessee, United States. Established in 1904, the city  has an area of 6 square miles. The population was 841 at the 2010 census.

History
Coalmont was established as a coal mining company town around 1904, operated by the Sewanee Coal, Coke and Land Company. Residences, businesses and commercial buildings in Coalmont were built and owned by the company, but individual miners could also build their own homes. A battery of coke ovens dating from the first decade of the 20th century is listed on the National Register of Historic Places. The Coalmont Bank Building also is listed.

Geography
Coalmont is located at  (35.344309, -85.717252).

Demographics

2020 census

As of the 2020 United States census, there were 784 people, 308 households, and 209 families residing in the city.

2000 census
As of the census of 2000, there were 948 people, 369 households, and 281 families residing in the city. The population density was 159.4 people per square mile (61.5/km2). There were 404 housing units at an average density of 67.9 per square mile (26.2/km2). The racial makeup of the city was 99.26% White, 0.11% African American, 0.11% Native American, and 0.53% from two or more races. Hispanic or Latino of any race were 0.21% of the population.

There were 369 households, out of which 36.9% had children under the age of 18 living with them, 58.3% were married couples living together, 15.4% had a female householder with no husband present, and 23.6% were non-families. 19.8% of all households were made up of individuals, and 8.4% had someone living alone who was 65 years of age or older. The average household size was 2.57 and the average family size was 2.97.

In the city, the population was spread out, with 25.1% under the age of 18, 10.7% from 18 to 24, 29.4% from 25 to 44, 24.3% from 45 to 64, and 10.5% who were 65 years of age or older. The median age was 35 years. For every 100 females, there were 90.7 males. For every 100 females age 18 and over, there were 92.4 males.

The median income for a household in the city was $21,750, and the median income for a family was $24,583. Males had a median income of $30,966 versus $17,656 for females. The per capita income for the city was $11,842. About 27.3% of families and 27.0% of the population were below the poverty line, including 28.7% of those under age 18 and 19.0% of those age 65 or over.

References

Cities in Tennessee
Cities in Grundy County, Tennessee
Company towns in Tennessee
Populated places established in 1904